Joash ( Yō’āš, "Yah is strong") was the fourth High Priest of Solomon's Temple. Josephus wrote that after Azariah his son 'Joram' became the new High Priest.

Abraham
Isaac
Jacob
Levi
Kohath
Amram
Aaron
Eleazar
Phinehas
Abishua
Bukki
Uzzi
Zerahiah
Meraioth
Amariah
Ahitub
Zadok
Ahimaaz
Azariah

Footnotes and references

10th-century BCE High Priests of Israel
9th-century BCE High Priests of Israel